To be hanged, drawn and quartered was a penalty in England, Wales, Ireland and the United Kingdom for several crimes, but mainly for high treason. This method was abolished in 1870.

References

Sources
 

 

Torture
English criminal law
Medieval English law
Hanged, drawn and quartered
People executed by the United Kingdom by hanging
People executed by the United Kingdom by hanging, drawing and quartering